(–)-Sabinene synthase (EC 4.2.3.109) is an enzyme with systematic name geranyl-diphosphate diphosphate-lyase [cyclizing, (–)-sabinene-forming]. This enzyme catalyses the following chemical reaction

 geranyl diphosphate  (–)-sabinene + diphosphate

This enzyme requires Mg2+.

References

External links 
 

EC 4.2.3